The 2007 Autobacs Super GT Series was the fifteenth season of the Japan Automobile Federation Super GT Championship including the All Japan Grand Touring Car Championship (JGTC) era and the third season as the Super GT series. It is also marked as the twenty-fifth season of a JAF-sanctioned sports car racing championship dating back to the All Japan Sports Prototype Championship. It is a series for Grand Touring race cars divided into two categories: GT500 and GT300. This was the final season for the 350Z, as it was announced by Nissan and Nismo near the end of the season that the new R35 GT-R would be replacing it the following season. The season began on March 18 and ended on November 4, 2007, after 9 races.

In the GT500 class, ARTA drivers Ralph Firman and Daisuke Itō won the championship in a dominating fashion, becoming the first GT500 champion to clinch the title before the final race of the season, a feat only matched by the 2012 champions Masataka Yanagida and Ronnie Quintarelli as of the end of the 2018 season. In the GT300 class, Kazuya Oshima and Hiroaki Ishiura in the apr Toyota MR-S won the driver's championship title by winning the tiebreaker against the Shiden of Kazuho Takahashi and Hiroki Katoh - the two teams finished the season with the same number of points, but Oshima and Ishiura had two race wins compared to Takahashi and Katoh's one. Takahashi and Katoh's overall consistency, however, would gave Cars Tokai Dream28 the team's championship title by six points over Oshima and Ishiura.

Drivers and teams

GT500

GT300

Schedule

Season Winners

Standings

GT500 Drivers
Scoring system

Only the best four results in the first six races would be counted for the championship.
There were no points awarded for pole position and fastest lap in the final race.

GT300 Class (Top 3)

Drivers

Teams

External links

 Super GT official race archive 
 

Super GT seasons
Super GT